Stoner Jesus Bible Study is a Centennial, Colorado Bible study group founded by Deb Button in May, 2014. As of 2015, the group was led by Pastor Greg. Button brought together a group of around 20 or 30 individuals through social media. The group includes people of many faiths or no faith at all. Button, who calls herself a conservative, says she voted against Colorado legalization of marijuana initiatives before founding the group.

Criticism
Steve Rudd in has stated in Drugs and the Bible: E, Shrooms, Cocaine, Crack, Marijuana that using "illicit" drugs is a form of sorcery. Jennifer LeClaire writing for Charisma magazine called the group "blasphemous".

See also
First Church of Cannabis

References

2014 establishments in Colorado
Cannabis and religion
Cannabis in Colorado
Centennial, Colorado
Religion in Colorado
Religious organizations established in 2015
Religious organizations using entheogens